Iker Belausteguigoitía (9 October 1927 – 8 June 1991) was a Mexican sailor. He competed at the 1964 Summer Olympics and the 1968 Summer Olympics.

References

External links
 

1927 births
1991 deaths
Mexican male sailors (sport)
Olympic sailors of Mexico
Sailors at the 1964 Summer Olympics – 5.5 Metre
Sailors at the 1968 Summer Olympics – 5.5 Metre
Sportspeople from Bilbao
Spanish emigrants to Mexico